Little Angels is a Bafta-nominated British reality television show which ran for five series on BBC Three from February 2004 to October 2005.

Format
The series, in the docu-soap genre, aimed to show parents how to overcome common behavioural problems in their children, using a team of experts who observed and gave advice. The format of each programme involved experts monitoring the behaviour of the family and the children, before discussing with the parents the real underlying causes of the problem, which frequently involved the parents themselves. The experts then discussed a course of action with the parents, later coaching them on how to change their own and their children's behaviour to improve the situation. This was frequently achieved in scenes where the family was filmed in a communal activity, with the parents receiving advice from the attending professional via an ear piece. In addition to its entertainment value, Little Angels gave viewers strategies to deal with common problems, and offered real help to the family being filmed.

Reception
Little Angels was the first in a series of reality television programmes to focus on parenting, with successors including The House of Tiny Tearaways. Considered among the strongest of BBC Three's programmes by Stuart Murphy, then the channel's controller, it was praised for reflecting "real day to day issues" in a government-commissioned report on the channel. Little Angels was nominated for a Bafta award in 2005. It was in 2005 that its most famous parent, Welsh actress Jynine James took part in the series with her 6-year-old son Harrison. The show's experts, Tanya Byron, Stephen Briers, Rachel Morris and Laverne Antrobus, became household names.

Transmissions

Main series

Little Angels Xmas Special: broadcast 20 December 2004

Teen Angels
Teen Terrors to Teen Angels in 2006

Tie-in book
A book based on the series was published by the BBC in 2005, co-written by Tanya Byron and the show's executive producer, Sacha Baveystock.

References

External links

BBC reality television shows
BBC television documentaries
2000s British reality television series
2004 British television series debuts
2006 British television series endings
English-language television shows